Consequence is an album by American saxophonist Jackie McLean recorded in 1965, but not released on Blue Note until 1979 as LT-994. In 1993, it was released as part of the four-disc Mosaic compilation The Complete Blue Note 1964-66 Jackie McLean Sessions, which was limited to 5,000 copies. In 2005, it was finally released on a limited edition CD as Blue Note 11428.

Reception
The Allmusic review by Thom Jurek awarded the album 3½ stars and stated: "The music here is much more straight-ahead than on other McLean dates from the 1960s.... This is a welcome addition to the McLean catalog on disc."

Track listing
All compositions by Jackie McLean except as noted
 "Bluesanova" (Lee Morgan) - 7:30
 "Consequence" - 5:32
 "My Old Flame" (Sam Coslow, Arthur Johnston) - 5:16
 "Tolypso" - 6:02
 "Slumber" (Morgan) - 6:05
 "Vernestune" - 5:53

Personnel
Jackie McLean - alto saxophone
Lee Morgan - trumpet
Harold Mabern - piano
Herbie Lewis - bass
Billy Higgins - drums

References

Blue Note Records albums
Jackie McLean albums
1979 albums
Albums recorded at Van Gelder Studio
Albums produced by Alfred Lion